McCullers Crossroads is an unincorporated community in southern Wake County, North Carolina, United States, located midway between  Raleigh and Fuquay Varina.  It lies at the intersection of US 401 (Fayetteville Road) and SR 1010 (Ten-Ten Road). Wake Technical Community College has its main campus nearby.

References

Unincorporated communities in Wake County, North Carolina
Unincorporated communities in North Carolina